Catherine Martin (born 30 September 1972) is an Irish Green Party politician who has served as Minister for Tourism, Culture, Arts, Gaeltacht, Sport and Media since June 2020 and Deputy Leader of the Green Party since June 2011. She has been a Teachta Dála (TD) for the Dublin Rathdown constituency since 2016.

Personal life
Martin was born in 1972 and is a native of Carrickmacross, Monaghan. She studied at Maynooth University. She was a teacher of English and Music, and the head of the Green Schools Committee at St. Tiernan's Community School in Dundrum for 15 years prior to being elected to the Dáil. She is married to Francis Noel Duffy, also a Green Party TD and they have three children together. Catherine and Francis first met in 1999 during a local election in their native Carrickmacross in County Monaghan, where Catherine's brother Vincent P. Martin and Francis' father were both campaigning for office. Vincent is also a member of the Green Party. In June 2020, Vincent became a Senator upon the Green Party entering government.

Political career
She joined the Green Party in 2007. In 2009, her brother, Vincent, began a hiatus from politics and as a result Catherine was co-opted to Vincent's seat on the Monaghan County Council. Catherine in turn vacated the seat upon the death of the Martins' mother and co-opted it to local green party member Darcy Lonergan. She was elected as Deputy Leader of the Green Party in 2011 simultaneous to Eamon Ryan becoming leader. In 2014, she was elected to Dún Laoghaire–Rathdown County Council, and was elected to the Dáil following the 2016 general election, after receiving 4,122 first preference votes.

She was the Green Party's Education Spokesperson. Martin was elected the first chair of The Irish Women's Parliamentary Caucus in November 2017, an organisation she spearheaded the creation of. 

In May 2020, following nominations from several councillors, she said that she would give 'serious consideration' into running for leadership of the Green Party in the 2020 Green Party leadership election. On 6 June, it was confirmed she would contest the leadership. Martin received 200 nominations for the contest, four times as many as was needed. Within the Green Party, Martin's candidacy is seen to represent the views of younger, more radical Green Party members who did not wish for the party to enter into coalition with Fine Gael or Fianna Fáil, in contrast to the leadership of Eamon Ryan which is seen to represent the moderate "old guard" who are open to working with those parties.

Despite this, Martin was the lead negotiator for the Green Party in the government formation talks with Fine Gael and Fianna Fáil, and after a deal was reached, Martin endorsed the deal and argued in favour of it. It was noted at the time Martin's husband Francis Noel Duffy abstained from the vote on the deal, and later spoke out against the deal. Martin suggested that this was "part of a healthy debate" within the Green Party over the merits of the deal. 

Upon entering the government, Martin was appointed as Minister for Tourism, Culture, Arts, Gaeltacht, Sport and Media, succeeding both Josepha Madigan and Shane Ross in different aspects of her portfolio.

In July 2020, Ryan retained the leadership of the Green Party by narrowly defeating Martin by 994 votes (51.24%) to 946 (48.76%), a winning margin of 48 votes (2.47%), in a postal ballot of party members (turnout was 66.7% of the 2,923 ballots sent out, and there were 10 spoiled votes (0.5%) among the 1,950 ballots returned).

On 17 December 2022, she was re-appointed to the same positions following Leo Varadkar's appointment as Taoiseach.

See also
Families in the Oireachtas

References

External links

Catherine Martin's page on the Green Party website

1972 births
21st-century women Teachtaí Dála
Green Party (Ireland) TDs
Living people
Local councillors in Dún Laoghaire–Rathdown
Martin family (Green Party)
Members of the 32nd Dáil
Members of the 33rd Dáil
Spouses of Irish politicians
Alumni of St Patrick's College, Maynooth
Women government ministers of the Republic of Ireland